Azra  District is a district of Logar Province, Afghanistan. It is located in the eastern part of the district and is 140 km from the capital Kabul. It was moved from Paktia Province. The district is geographically isolated from the capital of Logar.  The primary agriculture in the district is hemp. The population in 2019 was estimated to be 22,588.lMaulana Habib Jan Haqqani,Aman Ullah Farooqi, Hayat Ullah, Shamal Khan and Muhammad Kamal are the  prominent political figures; Follows the footprinits of their ancestors like the well-known religious scholar  Maulana Muhammad Amin (late) and the former Jihadist Muhammad Azeem.

References

A para from the Article of Aman Ullah Farooqi

Districts of Logar Province